Mazzolari is an Italian surname. Notable people with the surname include:

Cesare Mazzolari (1937–2011), Italian Roman Catholic bishop
Primo Mazzolari (1890–1959), Italian Roman Catholic priest

Italian-language surnames